Georgy Porgy may refer to:

 "Georgie Porgie", the traditional nursery rhyme
 "Georgy Porgy" (song) by Toto featuring Cheryl Lynn
 Georgie Porgie (producer), George Andros, a music producer and recording artist
 "Georgy Porgy" (short story), a short story by Roald Dahl, collected in Kiss Kiss